Anastasia Maria Webb (born June 15, 1999) is a former American artistic gymnast. She competed for the Oklahoma Sooners women's gymnastics team. In 2021, she became the NCAA All Around Champion and tied for the floor and vault titles, to go along with OU's team championship from 2019.

Personal life
Webb was born in Salinas, California, to Chris and Magda Webb. She has one brother, George. Webb grew up in Morton Grove, Illinois. She attended Niles West High School and graduated in 2017. She is fluent in Greek.

Gymnastics

Early career
Webb started gymnastics in 2004. She trained at the Illinois Gymnastics Institute in Westmont, Illinois. At the 2017 Nastia Liukin Cup, she finished ninth in the all-around.

NCAA career
Webb competes for the Oklahoma Sooners women's gymnastics team. As a freshman in 2018, she won six event titles: two on vault, two on uneven bars, one on balance beam, and one on floor. At UCLA on February 4, she scored a perfect 10 on balance beam. She was the Big 12 co-champion on floor. At the NCAA Championship, she won a silver medal with the Oklahoma team and tied for fifth on floor.

As a sophomore in 2019, Webb won 11 event titles: three in the all-around, one on vault, one on uneven bars, five on balance beam, and one on floor. She won a gold medal with the Oklahoma team at the NCAA Championship.

As a junior in 2020, Webb won 16 event titles: five in the all-around, two on vault, four on balance beam, and five on floor.

Webb was a senior in 2021. At the NCAA Championship, she won gold medals in the all-around and on vault and floor, and she won a silver medal with the Oklahoma team.

Webb was awarded the 2021 Honda Sports Award for gymnastics.

Career perfect 10.0

Competitive history

NCAA

References

1999 births
Living people
American female artistic gymnasts
Oklahoma Sooners women's gymnasts
NCAA gymnasts who have scored a perfect 10
Sportspeople from Salinas, California